Diamantis Slaftsakis (Greek: Διαμαντής Σλαφτσάκης; born July 27, 1994) is a Greek professional basketball player for PAOK of the Greek Basket League. He is 2.02 m (6 ft 7  in) tall. He can play at both the small forward and power forward positions.

Youth career
Slaftsakis played youth basketball with Halkidona and Mantoulidis, before he started his pro career.

Professional career
Slaftsakis began his professional career with the Greek League club KAOD, during the 2012–13 season. He left KAOD, when the club was relegated down from the first-tier Greek Basket League, due to financial problems, in 2015. He then joined Koroivos Amaliadas.

On July 21, 2016, Slaftsakis signed with Apollon Patras. He then joined Trikala Aries, where he became the team's captain.

On July 29, 2018, he joined Aris of the Greek Basket League, where he spent three consecutive seasons. 

On July 5, 2021, Slaftsakis signed with Kolossos Rodou. In 25 games, he averaged 3.1 points and 2 rebounds, playing around 11 minutes per contest. On August 10, 2022, he moved back to Thessaloniki for PAOK.

Greek national team
Slaftsakis was a member of the junior national teams of Greece. He played at the 2010 FIBA Europe Under-16 Championship, the 2012 FIBA Europe Under-18 Championship, the 2013 FIBA Europe Under-20 Championship, and the 2014 FIBA Europe Under-20 Championship with the junior national teams of Greece.

References

External links
FIBA Archive Profile
FIBA Europe Profile
Eurobasket.com Profile
RealGM.com Profile
DraftExpress.com Profile 
Scouting4u.com Profile
Greek Basket League Profile

1994 births
Living people
Apollon Patras B.C. players
Aris B.C. players
Aries Trikala B.C. players
K.A.O.D. B.C. players
Koroivos B.C. players
Kolossos Rodou B.C. players
P.A.O.K. BC players
Power forwards (basketball)
Small forwards